Józef Kasparek (1915–2002) was a Polish lawyer, historian, and political scientist.

Until World War II he lived in southeastern Poland (in Poland's southern Kresy), in an area that is now in western Ukraine.

Early years
Józef Kasparek was born in 1915 in Broumov (in German, Braunau), Bohemia, Austro-Hungarian Empire, in what is now the Czech Republic, near that country's border with what was then German Silesia and is now Poland's Lower Silesian Province.  Kasparek was the son of Teodor Kasparek (1867–1940) and Emilia, née Obst von Minnenthal. The father was a lawyer who, before World War I, had been a judge in Austrian-ruled Bosnia and was now, aged nearly fifty, serving as a volunteer in Józef Piłsudski's Polish Legions; in his youth, parting ways with his lawyer-father's conservatism and Germanic-culture orientation, he had co-founded the Polish Socialist Party with Ignacy Daszyński before studying law in Zürich, Switzerland.

While Teodor Kasparek was serving in Piłsudski's Legions, his son Józef spent his first years at Żurawno, on the Dniester River, birthplace of one of the 16th-century founders of Polish literature, Mikołaj Rej.  Józef later attended the Lwów Corps of Cadets, a state-run military-style secondary school.  He also studied piano at his paternal maiden aunts' well-regarded music school in Lwów.  Later, as a young man, he participated in stage plays under the tutelage of the celebrated theater director, Leon Schiller.  He drew portraits with the skill of an inspired artist. But Józef, whom his mother called a "gawędziarz" (story-teller), seemed to find himself especially as a writer.  While a law student at Lwów University, he wrote for the Lwów "political-opposition" newspaper, Dziennik Polski (The Polish Daily), edited by Klaudiusz Hrabyk, and compiled a collection of short stories that was about to be published when World War II supervened.

Carpathian Rus
In late 1938, soon after the Munich Conference, Józef Kasparek, a 23-year-old Lwów University law student and Polish Army artillery reservist, helped initiate and carry out, under Polish General Staff direction, covert operations in Carpathian Rus.  The object of Akcja Łom (Operation Crowbar)—Kasparek was unaware of the cryptonym—coordinated with operations by Hungarian paramilitary forces, was to subvert the Nazi-German-aligned regime of Avhustyn Voloshyn and restore that easternmost, smallest region of Czechoslovakia to Hungary.  Carpathian Rus was being turned by the Organization of Ukrainian Nationalists into a Piedmont to aspirations for Ukrainian national independence, which might have been won for the first time since medieval Kievan Rus'.

A Ukrainian sich (military camp) outside the Rusyn capital, Uzhhorod, was, under German tutelage, training Ukrainians from southeastern Poland for prospective action in Poland jointly with Germany.  This constituted a clear and present danger to the Polish population just across the Carpathian Mountains in largely Ukrainian-populated southeastern Poland, as Adolf Hitler worked to complete a near-total encirclement of Poland on her north, west and south while Poland's eastern frontier faced a hostile Soviet Union.

Hungary had ruled Carpathian Rus from the Middle Ages until defeated in World War I, and had been lobbying Adolf Hitler to sanction Hungary's repossession of Rus.  Following the Polish-Hungarian covert operations in Carpathian Rus, under the First Vienna Award in November 1938, Hungary received some largely Hungarian-populated areas of Carpathian Rus.

Further coordinated Polish-Hungarian partisan operations ultimately led to the restoration, in mid-March 1939, of Hungarian sovereignty over all of Carpathian Rus and the re-establishment of the historic common Polish-Hungarian border.

Six months later, during the invasion of Poland in September 1939, that common border would become of pivotal importance when Hungarian Regent Miklós Horthy's grateful government, as a matter of "Hungarian honor", declined Hitler's request to transit German forces across Rus into southeastern Poland to speed Poland's conquest.  This in turn allowed the Polish government and tens of thousands of Polish military personnel to escape into neighboring Romania and Hungary, and from there to France and French-mandated Syria to carry on operations as the third-strongest Allied belligerent after Britain and France.

Before the outbreak of World War II, for his part in the Carpathian operation, Kasparek received the Cross of Valor (Krzyż Walecznych).  After the war, in Britain, General Bolesław Bronisław Duch heard of the operation from other participants and nominated Kasparek for Poland's highest military decoration, the Virtuti Militari.  At the session of the kapituła (chapter), however, the nomination was blocked by General Władysław Anders after Duch adamantly opposed Anders' own nomination of his paymaster for the Virtuti Militari.

World War II
Kasparek fought in defense of Poland during the country's invasion in September 1939. A particular turning point in the September Campaign for Kasparek, which likely saved his life, occurred when he was sent to Żółkiew for maps and, at 16th-century Hetman Stanisław Żółkiewski's castle, met Colonel Stanisław Maczek (who later in the war, in Great Britain, would become commander of the Polish First Armored Division).  Maczek transferred Kasparek, who had just been wounded by a German aerial bomb outside the castle, to a newly formed artillery battery, thereby liberating him from his Virtuti-Militari-decorated sadistic captain.

After the Soviet Army entered Lwów, the local Polish Army commander, General Władysław Langner, ordered his forces to surrender to the Soviet forces and place themselves in Soviet custody.  Kasparek showed the independent streak that he had inherited from his parents and refused to obey the order. He attempted unsuccessfully to convince fellow officers to do likewise. By refusing what he considered a disastrous order on Langner's part, Kasparek avoided becoming, like the officers who obeyed it, a victim of the Katyn massacres.  Soon after, he joined the nascent Polish resistance movement.

Denounced to the Soviet authorities, arrested, and interrogated for six months by the Soviet NKVD, Kasparek was sentenced to eight years in Soviet Gulag forced labor camps, called łagry by the Poles.  His pregnant wife had already been deported to Kazakhstan; their first daughter would die there at age two of pertussis.  Kasparek himself barely survived two years' hard labor, emaciation and near-fatal typhus before being "amnestied" with other Poles by the Soviets after Hitler's invasion of the Soviet Union (June 1941).

Joining General Władysław Anders' new Polish army, the Second Corps, being formed in the USSR, Kasparek and his wife, reunited after two years, were evacuated to the Middle East.  There Kasparek served as adjutant to General Leopold Okulicki. From the Middle East, rather than going on to Italy with most of the Second Corps, Kasparek and his wife transferred into the Polish Air Force in Great Britain.  After the war, he was a contract military officer, serving as adjutant to General Bolesław Bronisław Duch, until 1948, when Polish military units were disbanded.

United States
In December 1951 Kasparek moved his family to the United States, where he would live out the next fifty years. In the United States, resuming an interest in comparative constitutional systems that Kasparek had begun in law school, he wrote a doctoral thesis that became the book, The Constitutions of Poland and of the United States.  The book compares, and traces mutual influences upon, the constitutions of the United States and Poland, including the world's first modern codified national constitution, the United States Constitution that went into effect in 1789, and the world's second, Poland's Constitution of May 3, 1791.

Kasparek had experienced war at first hand.  By the 1950s he had concluded that the world's peoples must replace warfare with global procedures to budget the world's resources to meet the world's needs.  His view was borne out by subsequent decades, which brought nuclear-weapons limitation treaties and a growing realization that global environmental threats call for global remedies.

Family
 Wife, Sylvia
 Son, Christopher Kasparek, writer, born 1945
 his daughter, Monica
 Daughter, Hania LaBorn
 her son, Joseph

Works
Joseph Kasparek, "Kinships between the United States and Polish Constitutions (to 1831)", Antemurale, XVIII, 1974, pp. 9–61.
Joseph Kasparek, The Constitutions of Poland and of the United States:  Kinships and Genealogy, Miami, Florida, The American Institute of Polish Culture, 1980.
Józef Kasparek, "Poland's 1938 Covert Operations in Ruthenia", East European Quarterly, vol. XXIII, no. 3 (September 1989), pp. 365–73.
Józef Kasparek, Przepust karpacki:  tajna akcja polskiego wywiadu (The Carpathian Bridge:  a Covert Polish Intelligence Operation), Warszawa, Wydawnictwo Czasopism i Książek Technicznych SIGMA NOT, 1992, .

See also
First Vienna Award
Hungary–Poland relations
List of Poles
List of guerrillas
Constitution of 3 May 1791

Notes

References
 Jerzy Kupliński, "Polskie działania dywersyjne na Ukrainie Zakarpackiej w 1938 r." ("Polish 1938 Covert Operations in Transcarpathian Ukraine"), Wojskowy Przegląd Historyczny (Military Historical Review), no. 4, 1996. 
Paweł Samuś, Kazimierz Badziak, Giennadij Matwiejew, : polskie działania dywersyjne na Rusi Zakarpackiej w świetle dokumentów Oddziału II Sztabu Głównego WP (Operation Crowbar:  Polish Covert Operations in Transcarpathian Rus in Light of Documents of Section II of the Polish General Staff), Warsaw, Adiutor, 1998.
Edmund Charaszkiewicz, "Referat o działaniach  dywersyjnych na Rusi Karpackiej" ("Report on Covert Operations in Carpathian Rus"), in Zbiór dokumentów ppłk. Edmunda Charaszkiewicza, opracowanie, wstęp i prypisy [A Collection of Documents by Lt. Col. Edmund Charaszkiewicz, edited, with introduction and notes by] Andrzej Grzywacz, Marcin Kwiecień, Grzegorz Mazur (Biblioteka Centrum Dokumentacji Czynu Niepodległościowego, tom 9), Kraków, Księgarnia Akademicka, 2000, pp. 106–30.
 Tadeusz A. Olszański, "" ("Operation Crowbar"), Płaj: Almanach Karpacki, no. 21 (jesień [autumn] 2000). 
 Dariusz Dąbrowski, Rzeczpospolita Polska wobec kwestii Rusi Zakarpackiej (Podkarpackiej) 1938–1939 [The Polish Republic and the Transcarpathian (Subcarpathian) Rus Question in 1938–39], Europejskie Centrum Edukacyjne (European Educational Center), Toruń, 2007, .

1915 births
2002 deaths
People from Broumov
Historians of Poland
20th-century Polish historians
Polish male non-fiction writers
Polish political scientists
Polish Army officers
20th-century Polish male writers
Polish emigrants to the United States
20th-century political scientists